A guild (or ecological guild) is any group of species that exploit the same resources, or that exploit different resources in related ways. It is not necessary that the species within a guild occupy the same, or even similar, ecological niches.

Details
Guilds are defined according to the locations, attributes, or activities of their component species. For example, the mode of acquiring nutrients, the mobility, and the habitat zones that the species occupy or exploit can be used to define a guild. The number of guilds occupying an ecosystem is termed its disparity. Members of a guild within a given ecosystem could be competing for resources, such as space or light, while cooperating in resisting wind stresses, attracting pollinators, or detecting predators, such as happens among savannah-dwelling antelope and zebra.

A guild does not typically have strict, or even clearly defined boundaries, nor does it need to be taxonomically cohesive. A broadly defined guild will almost always have constituent guilds; for example, grazing guilds will have some species that concentrate on coarse, plentiful forage, while others concentrate on low-growing, finer plants. Each of those two sub-guilds may be regarded as guilds in appropriate contexts, and they might, in turn, have sub-guilds in more closely selective contexts. Some authorities even speak of guilds in terms of a fractal resource model. This concept arises in several related contexts, such as the metabolic theory of ecology, the scaling pattern of occupancy, and spatial analysis in ecology, all of which are fundamental concepts in defining guilds.

An ecological guild is not to be confused with a taxocene, a group of phylogenetically related organisms in a community that do not necessarily share the same or similar niches (for example, "the insect community"). Nor is a guild the same as a trophic species, organisms of the same species that have mutual predators and prey.

Example guilds

Browsers and terrestrial folivores
Forest canopy folivores
Forest floor scavengers
Grazers
Forbs
Graminoids (grasses, rushes and sedges)
Plankton
Saprophytes
Shrubs
Trees
Vines
Piscivores

Footnotes

References

Community ecology
Ecological niche
Ecology terminology
Environmental terminology
Habitat